Manuel Vitorino Pereira  (30 January 1853 – 9 November 1902) was Governor of Bahia from 1889 to 1890 and the second vice president of Brazil, serving under President Prudente de Morais from 1894 to 1898. He also served as the President of the Senate from 1895 to 1898 and as Acting President of Brazil during 3 months.

Vitorino was born in Salvador, Bahia.  He was a writer and a physician before entering politics.

References

1853 births
1902 deaths
Vice presidents of Brazil
Presidents of the Federal Senate (Brazil)
People from Salvador, Bahia
Governors of Bahia
Brazilian writers
19th-century Brazilian physicians
Federal Republican Party (Brazil) politicians

Candidates for Vice President of Brazil